Psychrobacter pacificensis is a Gram-negative, aerobic, non-spore-forming, catalase- and oxidase-positive, psychrophilic, nonmotile bacterium of the genus  Psychrobacter, which was isolated from 6000-m-deep seawater of the Japan Trench on the Hachijo Island in Japan.

References

External links
Type strain of Psychrobacter pacificensis at BacDive -  the Bacterial Diversity Metadatabase

Moraxellaceae
Bacteria described in 2000
Psychrophiles